Charmain Welsh (born 17 May 1937) is a British former diver. Welsh competed in the 1952 Summer Olympics and in the 1956 Summer Olympics.

She represented England at the 1954 British Empire and Commonwealth Games and England at the 1958 British Empire and Commonwealth Games. She won double gold in the 3 metres springboard and the 10 metres platform at the 1958 British Empire and Commonwealth Games in Cardiff, Wales.

References

External links
 

1937 births
Living people
British female divers
Olympic divers of Great Britain
Divers at the 1952 Summer Olympics
Divers at the 1956 Summer Olympics
Divers at the 1958 British Empire and Commonwealth Games
Commonwealth Games medallists in diving
Commonwealth Games gold medallists for England
Medallists at the 1958 British Empire and Commonwealth Games